The Gaze of the Gazelle is the memoir by the Persian author Arash Hejazi. This is the fourth of Hejazi's full-length novels. The Gaze of The Gazelle focuses on the political and social situation of Iran from Iranian Revolution (January 1978) until 2009–2010 Iranian election protests. The preface of this novel has been written by Paulo Coelho. The memoir was translated to German, Italian and Swedish.

References
http://gazeofthegazelle.com/

External links
Arash Hejazi official website

2011 novels
Novels set in Iran
Seagull Books books